Luis Irsandi (born 1 May 1992) is an Indonesian professional footballer who plays as a defender for Indonesian Liga 3 club Galacticos Bireuen. He is a product of PSMS Medan youth academy and played for the club in Indonesia Super League. He is recently awarded as best player in a pre-season tournament Piala Presiden Persiraja 2018. Before joining Persiraja Banda Aceh, he played for PSPS Pekanbaru in 2017.

Club career

PSPS Pekanbaru
In 2017, Luis Irsandi signed a one-year contract with Indonesian Liga 2 club PSPS Pekanbaru.

Persiraja Banda Aceh
He was signed for Persiraja Banda Aceh to play in Liga 2 in the 2018 season.

Honours

Club
Persiraja Banda Aceh
 Liga 2 third place (play-offs): 2019

References

External links
 Luis Irsandi at Soccerway
 Luis Irsandi at Liga Indonesia

1992 births
Living people
Indonesian footballers
Sportspeople from Medan
PSMS Medan players
PSPS Pekanbaru players
Persiraja Banda Aceh players
Liga 2 (Indonesia) players
Association football defenders
21st-century Indonesian people